Frank George Delahanty (December 29, 1882 in Cleveland, Ohio – July 22, 1966 in Cleveland, Ohio), was a professional baseball player who played outfielder in the Major Leagues from -. He would play for the New York Highlanders, Cleveland Indians, Buffalo Buffeds, and Pittsburgh Rebels. His brothers, Ed, Jim, Joe and Tom also played in the Major Leagues.  Frank was the last of the Delahanty brothers active in the major leagues, with his final appearance coming in the same month (May 1915) as his brother Jim's.

Delahanty died from an accidental fall in Cleveland at the age of 83.

External links

1882 births
1966 deaths
New York Highlanders players
Cleveland Naps players
Buffalo Buffeds players
Pittsburgh Rebels players
Major League Baseball outfielders
Baseball players from Cleveland
Atlanta Firemen players
Birmingham Barons players
Syracuse Stars (minor league baseball) players
Montgomery Senators players
New Orleans Pelicans (baseball) players
Louisville Colonels (minor league) players
Indianapolis Indians players
St. Paul Saints (AA) players
Minneapolis Millers (baseball) players
Accidental deaths in Ohio
Accidental deaths from falls